The homing pigeon, also called the mail pigeon or messenger pigeon, is a variety of domestic pigeons (Columba livia domestica) derived from the wild rock dove, selectively bred for its ability to find its way home over extremely long distances. The rock dove has an innate homing ability, meaning that it will generally return to its nest using magnetoreception. Flights as long as  have been recorded by birds in competitive pigeon racing.

Because of this skill, domesticated pigeons were used to carry messages as messenger pigeons. They are usually referred to as "pigeon post" if used in post service, or "war pigeon" during wars. Until the introduction of telephones, homing pigeons were used commercially to deliver communication.

Messenger pigeons are often incorrectly categorized as English Carrier pigeons, an ancient breed of fancy pigeons. They were used historically to send messages but lost the homing instinct long ago. Modern-day homing pigeons (homers) or racing pigeons (racing homers) do have "Carrier blood" in them because they are in part descendants of the old-style Carriers. This is one reason why they are still commonly but erroneously called "carrier pigeons".

History

By 3000 BC, Egypt was using homing pigeons for pigeon post, taking advantage of a singular quality of this bird, which when taken far from its nest is able to find its way home due to a particularly developed sense of orientation. Messages were then tied around the legs of the pigeon, which was freed and could reach its original nest. By the 19th century homing pigeons were used extensively for military communications.

The sport of flying messenger pigeons was well-established as early as 3000 years ago. They were used to proclaim the winner of the Ancient Olympics.
Messenger pigeons were used as early as 1150 in Baghdad and also later by Genghis Khan. By 1167 a regular service between Baghdad and Syria had been established by Sultan Nur ad-Din. In Damietta, by the mouth of the Nile, the Spanish traveller Pedro Tafur saw carrier pigeons for the first time, in 1436, though he imagined that the birds made round trips, out and back. The Republic of Genoa equipped their system of watch towers in the Mediterranean Sea with pigeon posts. Tipu Sultan of Mysore (1750–1799) also used messenger pigeons; they returned to the Jamia Masjid mosque in Srirangapatna, which was his headquarters. The pigeon holes may be seen in the mosque's minarets to this day.

In 1818, a great pigeon race called the Cannonball Run took place at Brussels. In 1860, Paul Reuter, who later founded Reuters press agency, used a fleet of over 45 pigeons to deliver news and stock prices between Brussels and Aachen, the terminus of early telegraph lines. The outcome of the 1815 Battle of Waterloo has often been claimed to have been delivered to London by pigeon but there is no evidence for this, and it is very unlikely; the pigeon post was rare until the 1820s. During the Franco-Prussian War pigeons were used to carry mail between besieged Paris and the French unoccupied territory. In December 1870, it took ten hours for a pigeon carrying microfilms to fly from Perpignan to Brussels.

Historically, pigeons carried messages only one way, to their home. They had to be transported manually before another flight. However, by placing their food at one location and their home at another location, pigeons have been trained to fly back and forth up to twice a day reliably, covering round-trip flights up to 160 km (100 mi). Their reliability has lent itself to occasional use on mail routes, such as the Great Barrier Pigeongram Service established between the Auckland, New Zealand, suburb of Newton and Great Barrier Island in November 1897, possibly the first regular air mail service in the world. The world's first "airmail" stamps were issued for the Great Barrier Pigeon-Gram Service from 1898 to 1908.

In the 19th century, newspapers sometimes used carrier pigeons.  To get news from Europe quicker, some New York City newspapers used carrier pigeons.  The distance from Europe to Halifax, Nova Scotia, is relatively short. So reporters stationed themselves in Halifax, wrote the information received from incoming ships, and put the messages in capsules attached to the legs of homing pigeons.  The birds would then fly to New York City where the information would be published.

Homing pigeons were still employed in the 21st century by certain remote police departments in Odisha state in eastern India to provide emergency communication services following natural disasters. In March 2002, it was announced that India's Police Pigeon Service messenger system in Odisha was to be retired, due to the expanded use of the Internet. The Taliban banned the keeping or use of homing pigeons in Afghanistan.

To this day, pigeons are still entered into competitions.

Navigation

Research has been performed with the intention of discovering how pigeons, after being transported, can find their way back from distant places they have never visited before. Most researchers believe that homing ability is based on a "map and compass" model, with the compass feature allowing birds to orient and the map feature allowing birds to determine their location relative to a goal site (home loft). While the compass mechanism appears to rely on the sun, the map mechanism has been highly debated. Some researchers believe that the map mechanism relies on the ability of birds to detect the Earth's magnetic field.

A prominent theory is that the birds are able to detect a magnetic field to help them find their way home. Scientific research previously suggested that on top of a pigeon's beak a large number of iron particles are found which remain aligned to Earth's magnetic north like a natural compass, thus acting as compass which helps pigeon in determining its home. However, a 2012 study disproved this theory, putting the field back on course to search for an explanation as to how animals detect magnetic fields.

A light-mediated mechanism that involves the eyes and is lateralized has been examined somewhat, but developments have implicated the trigeminal nerve in magnetoreception. Research by Floriano Papi (Italy, early 1970s) and more recent work, largely by Hans Wallraff, suggest that pigeons also orient themselves using the spatial distribution of atmospheric odors, known as olfactory navigation.

Other research indicates that homing pigeons also navigate through visual landmarks by following familiar roads and other man-made features, making 90-degree turns and following habitual routes, much the same way that humans navigate.

Research by Jon Hagstrum of the US Geological Survey suggests that homing pigeons use low-frequency infrasound to navigate. Sound waves as low as 0.1 Hz have been observed to disrupt or redirect pigeon navigation. The pigeon ear, being far too small to interpret such a long wave, directs pigeons to fly in a circle when first taking air, in order to mentally map such long infrasound waves.

Various experiments suggest that different breeds of homing pigeons rely on different cues to different extents. Other experiments have shown that altering the perceived time of day with artificial lighting or using air conditioning to eliminate odors in the pigeons' home roost affected the pigeons' ability to return home.

GPS tracing studies indicate that gravitational anomalies may play a role as well.

Roles

Postal carriage

A message may be written on thin light paper, rolled into a small tube, and attached to a messenger pigeon's leg. They will only travel to one "mentally marked" point that they have identified as their home, so "pigeon post" can only work when the sender is actually holding the receiver's pigeons.

With training, pigeons can carry up to 75 g (2.5 oz) on their backs. As early as 1903, the German apothecary Julius Neubronner used carrier pigeons to both receive and deliver urgent medication. In 1977, a similar system of 30 carrier pigeons was set up for the transport of laboratory specimens between two English hospitals. Every morning a basket with pigeons was taken from Plymouth General Hospital to Devonport Hospital. The birds then delivered unbreakable vials back to Plymouth as needed. The carrier pigeons became unnecessary in 1983 because of the closure of one of the hospitals. In the 1980s a similar system existed between two French hospitals located in Granville and Avranche.

Wartime communication

Birds were used extensively during World War I. One homing pigeon, Cher Ami, was awarded the French Croix de guerre for his heroic service in delivering 12 important messages, despite having been very badly injured.

During World War II, the Irish Paddy, the American G.I. Joe and the English Mary of Exeter all received the Dickin Medal. They were among 32 pigeons to receive this award, for their gallantry and bravery in saving human lives with their actions. Eighty-two homing pigeons were dropped into the Netherlands with the First Airborne Division Signals as part of Operation Market Garden in World War II. The pigeons' loft was located in London, which would have required them to fly  to deliver their messages. Also in World War II, hundreds of homing pigeons with the Confidential Pigeon Service were airdropped into northwest Europe to serve as intelligence vectors for local resistance agents. Birds played a vital part in the Invasion of Normandy as radios could not be used for fear of vital information being intercepted by the enemy.

During the Second World War, the use of pigeons for sending messages was highlighted in Britain by the Princesses Elizabeth and Margaret as Girl Guides joining other Guides sending messages to the World Chief Guide in 1943, as part of a campaign to raise money for homing pigeons.

Computing
The humorous IP over Avian Carriers (RFC 1149) is an Internet protocol for the transmission of messages via homing pigeon. Originally intended as an April Fools' Day RFC entry, this protocol was implemented and used, once, to transmit a message in Bergen, Norway, on 28 April 2001.

In September 2009, a South African IT company based in Durban pitted an 11-month-old bird armed with a data packed 4 GB memory stick against the ADSL service from the country's biggest Internet service provider, Telkom. The pigeon, Winston, took an hour and eight minutes to carry the data . In all, the data transfer took two hours, six minutes, and fifty-seven seconds—the same amount of time it took to transfer 4% of the data over the ADSL.

Smuggling
Homing pigeons have been reported to be used as a smuggling technique, getting objects and narcotics across borders and into prisons. For instance, between 2009 and 2015, pigeons have been reported to carry contraband items such as cell phones, SIM cards, phone batteries and USB cords into prisons in the Brazilian state of São Paulo. There have also been cases where homing pigeons were used to transport drugs into prisons.

Animal exploitation
Pigeon races are sometimes considered as a type of animal exploitation and against animal welfare, particularly where betting is involved, and animal welfare is regarded as secondary. For example, the animal rights organisation PETA criticises Taiwanese owners for flying birds across wide oceans where few reach their destination, claiming a fatality rate of 98%.

See also
 List of pigeon breeds
 American Show Racer
 Dovecote
 Pigeon intelligence
 Pigeon photography
 Tippler
 Otto J. Zahn

References

Further reading
 Lucy M Blanchard, Chico, the Story of a Homing Pigeon in the Great War, Diggory Press, 
 Carter W. Clarke,  "Signal Corps Pigeons". The Military Engineer 25.140 (1933): 133-138 Online.
 Jon Day, "Operation Columba" (review of Gordon Corera, Secret Pigeon Service, William Collins, 2018, 326 pp.), London Review of Books, vol. 41, no. 7 (4 April 2019), pp. 15–16.  "Pigeons flew across theRoman Empire carrying messages from the margins to the capital.  [In 43 BCE] Decimus Brutus broke Marc Antony's siege of Mutina [Modena, in northern Italy] by sending letters to the consuls via pigeon. ... [However, p]igeons only really came into their own with modern [times, especially d]uring the 19th and early 20th centuries".  (Jon Day, p. 15.) 
 Meir Shalev, A Pigeon and a Boy (English translation by Evan Fallenberg), a historical novel about the use of pigeons by the Israel Defense Forces (and the Haganah before Israel was founded in 1948) in the defence of Israel when it was first founded, and in the defence of the Jewish community before Israeli independence
 Jerry Spinelli, Wringer 
 
 "Nine Champions Create A Champion", Bob Kinney Silverado, The Thoroughbred, 15 May 1998

External links
 
 Pigeon and Business and Communication 
 The great pigeon race disaster of 97 suggests an answer to an enduring mystery, George Johnson, "ON SCIENCE", St. Louis Post Dispatch
 The System of Military Dovecotes in Europe from an 1891 Scientific American article at Project Gutenberg
 Joao Moreira Tavares: Carrier Pigeons (Portugal), in: 1914-1918-online. International Encyclopedia of the First World War.
 Resource for pigeon racers
 Round Trip War Birds, Popular Science, November 1941, article on US Army Signal Corps use of homing pigeons with first high-speed photos showing how a pigeon flies
 Fragment 'Those waiting for the birds' (2008, Eve Duchemin), documentary about Belgian homing pigeons
 

Airmail
Animal-powered transport
Animals in sport
Domestic pigeons
History of telecommunications
Pigeon breeds
Pigeon racing
Illegal drug trade techniques